Takahito Nomura (野村 貴仁, born January 10, 1969) is a former major league baseball player from Kōchi, Japan. He played on the Orix BlueWave, Yomiuri Giants, Nippon-Ham Fighters, and Milwaukee Brewers. Nomura recorded his name as "Takaki Nomura" from 2000 to 2003.

Nomura was one of the relief pitchers in the Pacific League during his early career, and his team won two championships (1995 and 1996) with his contributions from the bullpen. He was valued as a left-handed reliever, and was known for his wide curve. However, he was only effective for his first 7 seasons (1991–1997), and has gone downhill ever since.

Biography
Nomura was drafted in the third round of the 1990 draft by the Orix BlueWave. He pitched well as a reliever, and recorded a 0.98 ERA pitching in 37 games in 1995, greatly contributing to his team's championship that year. He pitched over 50 games in 1996 and 1997, occasionally making saves.

He was traded to the Yomiuri Giants in exchange for Masao Kida in 1998, but could not continue his previous success. He pitched in 40 games in 2001, but his pitching remained inconsistent, and was released after the season.

He joined the Milwaukee Brewers in 2002, pitching in 21 games, and became the first and only player to wear the number 95 in the Majors. He marked an 8.56 ERA, and was released again at the end of the season. He returned to Japan, signing with the Nippon-Ham Fighters, but only made 6 appearances. He joined the Macoto Cobras (a professional team in Taiwan) in 2004. He returned to his hometown, Kōchi, after retiring.

External links

1969 births
Japanese expatriate baseball players in the United States
Nippon Professional Baseball pitchers
Living people
Major League Baseball pitchers
Major League Baseball players from Japan
Milwaukee Brewers players
Nippon Ham Fighters players
Orix BlueWave players
People from Kōchi, Kōchi
Baseball people from Kōchi Prefecture
Yomiuri Giants players